Sylvia Lance defeated Esna Boyd 6–3, 3–6, 6–4, in the final to win the women's singles tennis title at the 1924 Australian Championships.

Seeds
The seeded players are listed below. Sylvia Lance is the champion; others show the round in which they were eliminated.

 Mall Molesworth (quarterfinals)
 Esna Boyd (finalist)
 Sylvia Lance (champion)
 Daphne Akhurst (semifinals)
 Lily Addison (first round)
 Kathleen Le Messurier (semifinals)
n/a 
 Marjorie Todd (quarterfinals)

Draw

Key
 Q = Qualifier
 WC = Wild card
 LL = Lucky loser
 r = Retired

Finals

Earlier rounds

Section 1

Section 2

Notes

 Meryl O'Hara Wood was the seventh seed in an original draw.

External links
 1924 Australian Championships on ITFtennis.com, the source for this draw
  Source for seedings

1924 in women's tennis
Women's Singles
1924 in Australian women's sport